Moms for Liberty is an American conservative 501(c)(4) nonprofit organization that claims to advocate for parental rights in schools. The organization has campaigned against COVID-19 restrictions in schools, including mask and vaccine mandates, and against school curriculums that mention LGBT rights, race, critical race theory, and discrimination, and multiple chapters have also campaigned to ban from school libraries books that address gender and sexuality issues. Moms for Liberty has been likened to the Tea Party movement and the Moral Majority organization.

Moms for Liberty has been criticized for harassment from its members, deepening divisions among parents, making it more challenging for school officials to educate students, and having close ties to the Republican Party rather than being a genuine grassroots effort. Many have classified the group to be extremist and it has also been designated as a hate group.

Founding and structure 

Moms for Liberty was co-founded on January 1, 2021, in Florida by former school board members Tina Descovich and Tiffany Justice, and by then-current school board member Bridget Ziegler. Ziegler has since left the organization. Republican activist and campaign consultant Marie Rogerson is the third-leading member of Moms for Liberty. Descovich receives a stipend as Moms for Liberty's executive director.

Descovich conceived of the organization in the fall of 2020, after losing a seat she had held on the Brevard County school board in Florida in a primary by nearly 10 percentage points to former district employee Jennifer Jenkins, who campaigned against Descovich's opposition to mask mandates during the COVID-19 pandemic and teacher raises. Voter turnout was higher among Republicans than Democrats county-wide.

The organization's website was registered in late 2020.

As of their first national gathering in Tampa, Florida on July 14—17, 2022, Moms for Liberty claimed to have 195 chapters in 37 states and nearly 100,000 members.

Ideology and political party connections
Moms for Liberty has been described as conservative. The leaders of Moms for Liberty say that their organization is non-partisan, but is grounded in conservative values. Conservative media have welcomed the organization. In the first few months after its incorporation on January 1, 2021, co-founder Tina Descovich appeared on The Rush Limbaugh Show and anti-vaxxer Naomi Wolf namechecked Moms for Liberty on the Fox News show Tucker Carlson Tonight. Breitbart News, Newsmax, and The Daily Caller also publicized Moms for Liberty during its first year.

All three founders are registered Republicans, and the organization has ties to the Republican Party. Moms for Liberty has praised Florida Republicans such as Governor Ron DeSantis, referring to him on social media as "the Parents' Governor". Ron DeSantis, along with other prominent Florida Republicans, spoke at Moms for Liberty's first national gathering in Tampa, Florida in July 2022. Bridget Ziegler, a co-founder and former co-director of Moms for Liberty, is the wife of Christian Ziegler, vice chairman of the Florida Republican Party. Crediting Moms for Liberty with bringing new voters to the Republican Party, Christian Ziegler told The Washington Post in October 2021 that he had "been trying for a dozen years to get 20- and 30-year-old females involved with the Republican Party, and it was a heavy lift to get that demographic. But now Moms for Liberty has done it for me."

Advocacy and reception 
The organization began by campaigning against COVID-19 related health safety restrictions in schools, challenging mask mandates and associated local policies. Members of Moms for Liberty broadened their agenda to encompass other school-related items, focusing on the way issues such as racism and religion are addressed in reading materials provided to students.

Critics have accused Moms for Liberty of deepening divisions among parents and making it more challenging for school officials to educate students. Left-leaning Media Matters for America has accused the organization of using "parental rights" as a cover for strategically harassing public schools. Jenkins, who replaced Descovich on the Brevard County school board, said that she was harassed by members of Moms for Liberty. According to Jenkins, a member of the group filed a false child abuse report with the county department of Child and Family Services against her. 

In April 2021, the Facebook group "Mandate Masks in Brevard County schools" (now "Families for Safe Schools") was founded in an effort to combat the Brevard County Moms for Liberty chapter.

In June 2021, the chair of the Williamson County Moms for Liberty chapter told Tennessee's Department of Education in a letter that the district's curriculum was in violation of a recently-enacted state law banning the teaching of ideas related to critical race theory. Specific complaints were made about texts featuring Martin Luther King Jr., Ruby Bridges, Civil Rights Movement protests, and school segregation. In November 2021, the Tennessee Department of Education rejected the complaint on procedural grounds.

In November 2021, the Brevard County Moms for Liberty chapter filed a lawsuit against the Brevard County School Board over its public participation policy, saying that the board has used the policy to limit speech and access of opposing viewpoints during meetings.

Moms for Liberty was criticized for offering a bounty to members of the public who "caught" teachers introducing texts or lessons in violation of New Hampshire's new law restricting discussions of race in school classrooms. On November 10, 2021, the New Hampshire Department of Education announced a website questionnaire to make it easier for the public to help enforce the law. A couple of days later, the New Hampshire Moms for Liberty chapter offered a monetary reward for doing so, tweeting: "We’ve got $500 for the person that first successfully catches a public school teacher breaking this law". Republican Governor of New Hampshire Chris Sununu's spokesman said "The Governor condemns the tweet referencing 'bounties' and any sort of financial incentive is wholly inappropriate and has no place".

In July 2022, the Moms for Liberty Twitter account was suspended for criticizing a California gender-affirming healthcare bill.

In August 2022, a Moms for Liberty activist advocated for separating LGBT students into "specialized" classes "like for example children with autism, Down Syndrome".

Descovich and Justice say that there is no evidence that Moms for Liberty members have threatened school boards, and said that they denounce inappropriate behavior by members of the organization.

Moms for Liberty has partnered with several conservative organizations to introduce conservative books into public school libraries.

In January 2023, New Republic writer Melissa Gira Grant, argued that the group uses "reality of disinvestment" in public libraries to argue for privatization of libraries, and is trying to "inject its agenda" into libraries.

Book banning efforts 

According to The Daily Beast, a spreadsheet accompanying the Williamson County letter of complaint contained several other stated concerns about the county's curriculum. An article about police brutality against civil rights demonstrators in the 1960s was criticised for its "negative view of Firemen and police." A fictional account of the American Civil War used with fifth-graders was deemed unsuitable because of its depictions of "out of marriage families between white men and black women". A book about Galileo Galilei, an astronomer persecuted by the Catholic Church for theorizing the Earth revolves around the Sun, should, according to the spreadsheet, not be read without some counterbalancing praise of the church: "Where is the HERO of the church?", asks the spreadsheet notation, "to contrast with their mistakes? ... Both good and bad should be represented". A picture book about seahorses was condemned for depicting "mating seahorses with pictures of positions and discussion of the male carrying the eggs." The Williamson County Moms for Liberty chapter told The Daily Beast in an e-mail: "Some books should be removed entirely. Some books are objectionable only because of how they are presented via the accompanying teacher's manual. And yes, some books would be better suited to a higher grade level due to their age inappropriate content."

In 2021, the Indian River County, Florida chapter requested the local school board remove from school libraries 51 books the group "deem(ed) to be pornographic or sexually explicit." A critically acclaimed young adult book about growing up gay, All Boys Aren't Blue, was pulled from the Vero Beach High School library after the group objected to it as being in violation of a Florida statute against providing access to pornography to children. The Hernando chapter objected to Looking for Alaska, The Absolutely True Diary of a Part-Time Indian, and two books by National Book Award winner Alex Gino.

In December 2021, the Wake County, North Carolina chapter filed a criminal complaint against the Wake County Public School System over the books Lawn Boy, Gender Queer: a Memoir, and George.

According to WFTS-TV, as of December 2021, "several schools" had removed books from shelves due to the efforts of various Moms for Liberty chapters.

In June 2022, Cabot, Arkansas Police opened an investigation after a recording surfaced featuring one of the group's leaders, Melissa Bosch, fantasizing about shooting school librarians, saying "they would all be plowed down with a freaking gun".

Funding
Co-founder Tina Descovich has stated that Moms for Liberty is funded by individual $50 memberships and the sale of Moms for Liberty T-shirts. Descovich has also stated that the organization has an annual budget of $300,000. Democrats have questioned how Moms for Liberty is being funded, pointing out that its expansion comes as Florida governor Ron DeSantis begins his reelection campaign. According to an analysis by Media Matters for America, Moms for Liberty benefits financially from right-wing funding and ties to traditional Republican political figures. The organization is well-connected to Republican politicians and groups and financially supported by more than membership fees and T-shirt sales. Marie Rogerson was paid to do campaign work for Florida Republican Representative Randy Fine. Moms for Liberty has received financial support from Conservatives for Good Government, a conservative Florida political action committee. The group also hosts fundraisers with conservative celebrities such as former Fox News host Megyn Kelly and hosted a fundraiser in June 2021 that was sponsored by Florida Republicans running for office. In June 2022, heiress Julie Fancelli donated $50,000 to Moms for Liberty.

References

External links
 
 Complaint to the Tennessee Department of Education

2021 establishments in Florida
Organizations established in 2021
Conservative political advocacy groups in the United States
Organizations established for the COVID-19 pandemic
Non-profit organizations based in Florida
Melbourne, Florida
Parents' organizations
Far-right organizations in the United States